João Lustosa da Cunha Paranaguá, the Marquis of Paranaguá (August 21, 1821 in Parnaguá – February 9, 1912 in Rio de Janeiro), was a politician and lawyer of the Empire of Brazil having been President of the Council of Ministers of Brazil on the 26th cabinet during the reign of Pedro II.

1821 births
1912 deaths
Brazilian nobility
Prime Ministers of Brazil
Liberal Party (Brazil) politicians
Government ministers of Brazil
Members of the Senate of the Empire of Brazil
Ministers of Justice of Brazil